Olešná is a municipality and village in Pelhřimov District in the Vysočina Region of the Czech Republic. It has about 600 inhabitants.

Administrative parts
Villages of Chválov, Plevnice and Řemenov are administrative parts of Olešná.

History
From 1 January 1980 to 23 November 1990, Olešná was administratively part of the town of Pelhřimov.

References

Villages in Pelhřimov District